Director Yaky Yosha's Summertime Blues (1984) is a youth drama about the last summer before the army, the last summer altogether.

Although somewhat similar in content to the Lemon Popsicle (Eskimo Limon) series, with a soundtrack full of rock and roll hits and a group of teens pursuing sex, it is a different film than the eighth Lemon Popsicle film four years later, which unfortunately was given the same sub-title Lemon Popsicle VIII - Summertime Blues.

Plot
It is the last summer before the army, an early 1980s Tel-Aviv summer, prior to the 1982 Lebanon War. Four friends are walking on the wild side before life starts walking over them. They have a Rock'n'Roll band and so, they're trying to add some sex and drugs and devour the whole enchilada. It will take them a hot summer to realize how young and naive they still are, how what really turns them on is first love, first heartache and everything in between. The original ending titles shows the protagonists' photos with information on those that died in service.

References

External links 
 

1984 films
1980s Hebrew-language films
Films directed by Yaky Yosha
Films set in 1982
1980s teen drama films
Films set in Tel Aviv
Israeli teen drama films
1984 drama films